George Seligman Oppenheimer (February 7, 1900 in New York City – August 14, 1977) was an American screenwriter, playwright, and journalist.

Career
In 1925, Oppenheimer cofounded The Viking Press, but becoming more interested in writing than publishing, he began a career as a screenwriter in Hollywood in 1933, hired to complete the screenplay of Samuel Goldwyn's comedy Roman Scandals (1933). For the rest of the 1930s he was employed by Metro-Goldwyn-Mayer, primarily as a script doctor, rewriting, editing or polishing existing scripts.

Oppenheimer was nominated for the Academy Award for Best Original Screenplay for his work on The War Against Mrs. Hadley at the 15th Academy Awards of 1942.

His contributions to theater criticism are recognized by the Newsday George Oppenheimer Award, which was awarded annually from 1979 to 2007 to the best New York debut production by an American playwright for a non-musical play.

Oppenheimer graduated from Williams College and studied at Harvard University with George Pierce Baker. He joined Newsday in 1955 to write the weekly "On Stage" column, became a daily critic in 1963, and was named Sunday drama critic in 1972.

Oppenheimer, a homosexual, never married. Oppenheimer was the occasional sexual partner of the young Harry Hay; the pair met while cruising on Hollywood Boulevard.

Selected filmography

 Roman Scandals (1933)
 Rendezvous (1935)
  Libeled Lady (1936)
 We Went to College (1936)
 London by Night (1937)
  The Last of Mrs. Cheyney (1937)
 Married Before Breakfast (1937)
 I'll Take Romance (1937)
 A Day at the Races (1937)
 Three Loves Has Nancy (1938)
 The Crowd Roars (1938)
  A Yank at Oxford (1938)
 Paradise for Three (1938)
 Man-Proof (1938)
 Honolulu (1939)
  Broadway Melody of 1940 (1940)
 I Love You Again (1940)
  Two-Faced Woman (1941)
 The Big Store (1941)
 The Feminine Touch (1941)
  The War Against Mrs. Hadley (1942)
 Pacific Rendezvous (1942)
 A Yank at Eton (1942)
 Slightly Dangerous (1943)
 The Youngest Profession (1943)
 Killer McCoy (1947)
 Adventures of Don Juan (1948)
 Born to Be Bad (1950)
 Perfect Strangers (1950)
 Anything Can Happen (1952)
 Decameron Nights (1953)
 Tonight We Sing (1953)

Publications 
 The Passionate Playgoer. A Personal Scrapbook, 1958 (editor)
 ''The View from the Sixties: Memories of a Spent Life, 1966

References

External links 
Obituary
Veröffentlichungsnachweis in the Open Library

1900 births
1977 deaths
20th-century American memoirists
Screenwriters from New York (state)
Songwriters from New York (state)
Jewish American screenwriters
American gay writers
LGBT Jews
Williams College alumni
LGBT people from New York (state)
Writers from New York City
20th-century American screenwriters
20th-century American Jews
20th-century LGBT people